Corybas globulus is a species of helmet orchid endemic to a small area of the New England Tableland in northern New South Wales. It is a relatively small orchid with a bright green, heart-shaped leaf and a bulbous, dark reddish purple flower.

Description
Corybas globulus is a terrestrial, tuberous, herbaceous plant that forms loose clonal colonies. The labellum is about as long as the dorsal sepal, tube-shaped and has three lobes. Flowering occurs from early May to mid June.

Taxonomy and naming
This orchid was first formally described in 2016 by David Jones and Lachlan Copeland who gave it the name Anzybas globulus. The description was published in Australian Orchid Review from a specimen collected in the Washpool National Park. In the same year, the same authorities changed the name to Corybas globulus "to allow for the different taxonomic views held at generic level within the subtribe". The specific epithet (globulus) is the diminutive form of the Latin word globus meaning "ball" or "sphere", hence "little sphere" in reference to the shape of the flower of this orchid.

Distribution and habitat
The orchid grows in open forest with a dense shrubby understorey. It is only known from the Washpool and Gibraltar Range National Parks.

References

External links
 

globulus
Orchids of New South Wales
Endemic orchids of Australia
Plants described in 2016